Sphenella aureliani is a species of tephritid or fruit flies in the genus Sphenella of the family Tephritidae.

Distribution
Hungary, Romania.

References

Tephritinae
Insects described in 1985
Diptera of Europe